Miechowice may refer to the following places:
Miechowice, Inowrocław County in Kuyavian-Pomeranian Voivodeship (north-central Poland)
Miechowice, Włocławek County in Kuyavian-Pomeranian Voivodeship (north-central Poland)
Miechowice, Masovian Voivodeship (east-central Poland)